"Om die dam" (English: Around the dam") Marathon is a yearly ultramarathon that is held in the South African town of Hartbeespoort (in the North West Province.

References

Ultramarathons
Marathons in South Africa